Soligalichsky Uyezd (Солигаличский уезд) was one of the subdivisions of the Kostroma Governorate of the Russian Empire. It was situated in the northwestern part of the governorate. Its administrative centre was Soligalich.

Demographics
At the time of the Russian Empire Census of 1897, Soligalichsky Uyezd had a population of 62,543. Of these, 99.9% spoke Russian as their native language.

References

 
Uezds of Kostroma Governorate
Kostroma Governorate